Alberto Quadri (born 9 January 1983 in Brescia) is an Italian footballer who last played for Maceratese.

In 2005, he left for Pizzighettone along with Matteo Deinite.

Quadri joined Lazio in June 2006, as part of César deal. He signed a 5-year deal.

References

External links

1983 births
Living people
Italian footballers
Italy youth international footballers
A.S. Pizzighettone players
S.S. Lazio players
A.C. Perugia Calcio players
A.C. Montichiari players
Taranto F.C. 1927 players
Spezia Calcio players
Mantova 1911 players
A.C. Monza players
U.S. Avellino 1912 players
Calcio Padova players
PFC Chernomorets Burgas players
Serie A players
Serie C players
First Professional Football League (Bulgaria) players
Expatriate footballers in Bulgaria
Association football midfielders
Footballers from Brescia
S.S. Maceratese 1922 players